The men's discus throw event at the 2006 World Junior Championships in Athletics was held in Beijing, China, at Chaoyang Sports Centre on 15 and 16 August.  A 1.75 kg (junior implement) discus was used.

Medalists

Results

Final
16 August

Qualifications
15 August

Group A

Group B

Participation
According to an unofficial count, 26 athletes from 20 countries participated in the event.

References

Discus throw
Discus throw at the World Athletics U20 Championships